The 2019 Notre Dame Fighting Irish football team represented the University of Notre Dame in the 2019 NCAA Division I FBS football season. The team was led by Brian Kelly, in his tenth season at Notre Dame. The Fighting Irish played their home games at Notre Dame Stadium in Notre Dame, Indiana and competed as an independent.

Previous season
The 2018 Notre Dame Fighting Irish football team finished 12–1 on the season, with an undefeated regular season followed by a 30–3 loss to the Clemson Tigers in the Cotton Bowl Classic, their first appearance in the College Football Playoff. Clemson would go on to defeat Alabama 44–16 in the 2019 College Football Playoff National Championship.

Offseason

Departures
 QB Brandon Wimbush (graduate transferred to UCF)
 RB Dexter Williams (drafted by the Green Bay Packers)
 WR Miles Boykin (drafted by the Baltimore Ravens)
 TE Alizé Mack (drafted by the New Orleans Saints)
 OL Luke Jones (transferred to Arkansas)
 DT Micah Dew-Treadway (graduate transferred to Minnesota)
 LB D.J. Morgan (transferred to UConn)
 CB Julian Love (drafted by New York Giants)
 DB Noah Boykin (transferred to UMass)
 DB Devin Studstill (transferred to USF)
 LB Drue Tranquill (drafted by the Los Angeles Chargers)
 LB Te'von Coney (signed by the Oakland Raiders)
 DT Jerry Tillery (drafted by the Los Angeles Chargers)
 S Derrik Allen (transferred to Georgia Tech)
 P Tyler Newsome (signed by the Los Angeles Chargers)
 K Justin Yoon (graduated)

Coaching changes
Departures
 
Autry Denson, the former running backs coach of the Fighting Irish, accepted the head coaching position at Charleston Southern University.

Additions

Lance Taylor was hired to replace Denson as running backs coach. Taylor previously spent time with the Carolina Panthers of the NFL, coaching wide receivers, and at Stanford University, coaching running backs.

The Shirt 2019
The 30-year-old tradition of "The Shirt Project" continued with the unveiling of the 2019 edition student t-shirt. For the first time, there is a sweatshirt to go with the traditional tee.

The project has sold more than 2.5 million shirts and raised more than $11 million over its 30 years of existence. Each year, a committee of students designs a shirt to raise money for Notre Dame student clubs and organizations. Actor Patrick Warburton was on hand for the ceremony, as was Coach Kelly.

This year's t-shirt features 'Notre Dame' in 1930's Art Deco lettering to mirror the style that is found all throughout the Stadium. It is set on a faded blue background and includes a very traditional white football and a clover in the middle.

Blue–Gold Game
The 90th edition of The Blue–Gold Game, an annual spring exhibition game, was played on April 13, 2019 at Notre Dame Stadium and was broadcast on NBCSN. It served as the 15th and final spring practice for the Irish. The Gold Team (defense) beat the Blue Team (offense) by the score of 58–45.

Award watch lists
Listed in the order that they were released

Training camp
The Irish officially kicked off the 2019 season as they do every season, traveling just under an hour south of campus to Culver Academies in Culver, IN, for an intense five-day training camp. The first practice of the season began in Culver on Sunday, August 4, and the team continued to practice in Culver until Thursday, August 8, at which point the Irish returned to campus to continue its training camp until fall classes begin on Tuesday, August 27.

Team captains
On Saturday, August 10, the day of Notre Dame's first practice of the season on campus, Brian Kelly publicly announced the captains for the 2019 Irish football team captains.  These captains are Ian Book, Chris Finke, Julian Okwara, Khalid Kareem, Jalen Elliott, Alohi Gilman, and Robert Hainsey. Six of these seven captains are seniors or older, with Hainsey being the lone junior captain this season.

2019 recruiting class
Notre Dame received 22 signed letters of intent, including 21 during the early signing period. The Class of 2019 includes 10 early enrollees, the most ever for the program, who opted to graduate high school early so that they could train and practice with the team during the 2018 spring semester.

Schedule

Rankings

Personnel

Coaching staff

Roster

Game summaries

at Louisville

New Mexico

at Georgia

Virginia

Bowling Green

USC

at Michigan

Notre Dame was routed by No. 19 Michigan 45-14, snapping an 8-game losing streak to top 10 teams for the Wolverines. The loss, combined with the loss to Georgia earlier in the season, ended Notre Dame's hopes to qualify for the playoffs.

Virginia Tech

After poor performances against USC and Michigan, Notre Dame stepped up defensively against Virginia Tech.  The hokies were held to their lowest total yards game since 2015 and lowest yards per play since 2016 in what was billed as "one of the best group effort performances" ever seen by Sports Illustrated sportswriter Bryan Driskell. Yet, Notre Dame still needed a late touchdown to win the game by a final score 21–20 and Notre Dame extended their home winning streak to 16 games.

After this win, ESPN analysts Kyle Bonagura and Mark Schlabach both projected that Notre Dame will play Kansas State in the Camping World Bowl on December 28 in Orlando, Florida as a part of their Week 10 predictions Notre Dame (ranked #15 after this week) "did not exactly play an inspired game in a come-from-behind win over Virginia Tech" according to ESPN Analyst Andrea Adelson.  However, Notre Dame is projected for a ten-win season.

at Duke

Navy

Boston College

at Stanford

vs. Iowa State (Camping World Bowl)

Players drafted into the NFL

References

Notre Dame
Notre Dame Fighting Irish football seasons
Cheez-It Bowl champion seasons
Notre Dame Fighting Irish football